The 1966–67 Coppa Italia, the 20th Coppa Italia was an Italian Football Federation domestic cup competition won by AC Milan.

First round 

* Vicenza, Modena and Palermo qualified after drawing of lots.

Intermediate round

Second round 

p=after penalty shoot–out

Third round 

p=after penalty shoot–out

Quarter–finals 
FC Bologna, Internazionale, Fiorentina and Napoli are added.

p=after penalty shoot–out

Semi–finals

Final

Top goalscorers

References

rsssf.com

Coppa Italia seasons
Coppa Italia, 1966-67
1966–67 domestic association football cups